The orange-spotted snakehead (Channa aurantimaculata) is a species of snakehead fish. Its body is of brownish colour intermixed with vertical orange stripes. Males have  taller dorsal fins with more intense coloration, and  narrower heads. It is endemic to Brahmaputra River basin. Its type locality is Dibrugarh, the most northeastern area of Assam, India. Dibrughar is the same type locality as that of Channa bleheri.

This species grows to 16 in (40 cm). It is probably a mouthbrooder, like most of the smaller snakeheads. One report is known from a German aquarist that a couple of his fish had bred.

In the aquarium

The orange-spotted snakehead is predatory, so it should not be housed with smaller fishes. It is comfortable in a water temperature within the range of 15-28 °C, and a pH of around 7. It requires a large, dimly lit, well-planted tank with places to hide. It breathes air and will suffocate if it is prevented from reaching the surface.

References

External links

snakeheads.org-  the comprehensive website for all aspects of snakeheads

Orange-spotted snakehead
Fish described in 2000